The South Carolina Gamecocks men's tennis team represents the University of South Carolina and competes in the Southeastern Conference.  The team has been coached by Josh Goffi since 2011.

Head coaches

Year-by-Year Results

References